Sebastiano Ghislieri (died 2 October 1627) was a Roman Catholic prelate who served as Bishop of Strongoli (1601–1627).

Biography
On 30 April 1601, Sebastiano Ghislieri was appointed during the papacy of Pope Clement VIII as Bishop of Strongoli.
On 13 May 1601, he was consecrated bishop by Camillo Borghese, Cardinal-Priest of Santi Giovanni e Paolo, with Alfonso Pisani, Archbishop of Santa Severina, and Guglielmo Bastoni, Bishop of Pavia, serving as co-consecrators. 
He served as Bishop of Strongoli until his death on 2 October 1627.

While bishop, he was the principal co-consecrator of Pirro Imperoli, Bishop of Jesi (1604).

References

External links and additional sources
 (for Chronology of Bishops) 
 (for Chronology of Bishops) 

17th-century Italian Roman Catholic bishops
Bishops appointed by Pope Clement VIII
1627 deaths